FC Gardabani (Georgian: სკ გარდაბანი) is a Georgian Association football club from the city of Gardabani. Following the 2022 season, they won promotion and advanced to Liga 4, the fourth tier of Georgian football system.

History
Gardabani was established in 2015 as a municipal club. They won the regional league tournament in the very first season. Promoted to Liga 3, Gardabani took the 1st place amid a tight competition with Mtskheta and Tskhumi.   

The club spent one year in the second division, which has been their highest point. After getting relegated, Gardabani took part in Liga 3 for two seasons. 

They knocked out three teams of the 2018 Cup campaign and reached the fourth round. In the same year, along with other nine teams that finished in the bottom half of the table, Gardabani were relegated to the fourth tier. However, the club no longer participated in any league for next two years. 

With the help of Egyptian investors Gardabani resumed functioning in early February 2021. The new management also unveiled plans to create a football academy for children and form another team for the Amateur League. 

In the first season the club failed to gain promotion, although the next year turned out fruitful. In the Cup, Gardabani defeated three opponents, including two third-tier members, and reached the fourth round, while in the league they topped the table from the start, won 22 matches out of 26 and accomplished their goal via automatic promotion.

Seasons

Honours
• Meore Liga 

Winners (1): 2015-16 

• Regionuli Liga

Winners (1): 2022

References

External Links

Profile on Soccerway

Official page on Facebook

Football clubs in Georgia (country)
Association football clubs established in 2015